The 2022 Northern Colorado Bears football team represented the University of Northern Colorado as a member of the Big Sky Conference during the 2022 NCAA Division I FCS football season. They were led by second-year head coach Ed McCaffrey and played their home games at Nottingham Field.  McCaffrey was fired on November 21, 2022, two days after the Bears completed their season with a 3–8 record (2–6 in Big Sky play), repeating the win-loss record of the prior season.

Previous season
The Bears finished the 2021 season 3–8, 2–6 in Big Sky play to finish in tenth place.

Preseason

Polls
On July 25, 2022, during the virtual Big Sky Kickoff, the Bengals were predicted to finish in a tie for eleventh in the Big Sky by the coaches and eleventh by the media.

Preseason All–Big Sky team
The Bears had one player selected to the preseason all-Big Sky team.

Defense

David Hoage – LB

Schedule

Source: Schedule

Game summaries

Houston Baptist

at Wyoming

at Lamar

Idaho State

at Idaho

at No. 5 Sacramento State

No. 4 Montana State

UC Davis

at Portland State

Northern Arizona

at Eastern Washington

References

Northern Colorado
Northern Colorado Bears football seasons
Northern Colorado Bears football